Incheon's Chinatown is Korea's only official Chinatown. It is in Jung-gu and was formed in 1884. It claims to be the largest Chinatown in South Korea, and features an 11-meter high Chinese-style gateway, or paifang.  As of 2007 few ethnic Chinese live in the Incheon Chinatown. There are both many food and various attractions in Incheon chinatown.

History
The history of Incheon Chinatown is over 100 years old.  While not all traditional culture of the first generation has been preserved, the area still harbors many of the flavors of China.

Incheon became a China-friendly city after the modern opening of late 1800s. Korea started modern trade by signing the China–Korea Treaty of 1882. Incheon's Chinatown area came into being with the opening of the Incheon Port in 1883 and Incheon's designation as an extraterritoriality of the Ching Dynasty. After this,  'Incheon Chinese Society' (華僑)  begun in earnest by establishing  '淸國專管租界' (Chinese Settlement) in today's Incheon in 1885. An 1883 report indicated that 63 Chinese people lived there. And they increased to 235 people in one year. In 1892, they increased to 637 people, and they increased to about 1000 people in early 1900. Overseas Chinese who currently live in Incheon in 2015 number 50,000 people. 'Incheon Chinatown' improved the relationship of Korea and China . Incheon Chinatown street name will change to China's well-known street or city names in 2016. Today, the Chinese residents of Chinatown are mostly 2nd or 3rd generation descendents of the early Chinese settlers.

Activity 
Incheon Chinatown provides people with various food, attractions. In Incheon Chinatown, there are many food such as Sweet and Sour pork, Assorted Seafood and Vegetables with Mustard Sauce, Noodles with Black Soybean Sauce (Jajangmyeon), Fortune Cookie, Mooncake, Gongal Bread (Pita Bread) and so on. On the busy streets of Korea's biggest Chinatown in Incheon stands Gonghwachun, one of the most popular Chinese restaurants among tourists to the area. And Moon Cake is a kind of bread, which is baked in a round moon-shaped food. It is a symbol of China's traditional Thanksgiving foods like a rice cake in Korea. And Gongal Bread (Pita Bread) is a kind of Chinese bread. It is called a Chinese pancake. Inside the bread, it is empty and the only outer part of the bread is inflately baked. There are also many places to buy various things such as Chipao, Antique Pottery, Traditional Tea, Jewelry and Accessories, and Tea cup sets. Chipao is a China's traditional costume. All men and women can wear this costume. but, It is usually referred to a dress for women. Also, Incheon Chinatown has many attractions such as Paeru, Uiseondang (a Chinese temple), History of Three States Mural Street, Korea and China Cultural Center, etc.  Paeru  is a Chinese traditional gate installed in the village entrance, Uiseondang is temple of Chinese, History of Three States Mural Street is decorated with murals with the explanation of important scenes of History of Three States. Incheon Chinatown is located close to other outing such as Freedom Park, Songwoldong Fairytale town, Wolmido, and so on.

Attractions related to China

There are many attractions related to China. These are a school for Overseas Chinese, The Coast of Catholicism, Korea and China Cultural Center, History of Three States Mural Street, Chinese Village Culture Experience, etc. A school for overseas Chinese is on the second floor in masonry building that was constructed in 1934. The Coast of Catholicism is currently used as an education place of the Catholic Church. Korea and China Cultural Center built in 2005 is a place that plays a major role in the history and cultural exchanges between Korea and China. History of Three States Mural Street means the walls that are decorated with murals and tiles with the explanation of important scenes of History of Three States on both sides of the road.

Attractions related to Japan
There are attractions related to Japan. They are the Old Japanese consulate general, Japan banks, and an Arched gate.

Nearby Tourist Attractions
There are Freedom Park, Wolmido Island, Sinpo Market, Incheon Art Platform, Dapdong Catholic Church, Fairytale town, etc. in near Incheon Chinatown  .

References

Further reading
 Yi Jung-hee. A Country Without a Chinatown, Joseon Ilbo, 2000
 Yang Phil-seoung. 2004. A country without a Chinatown: Yesterday and Today in the Overseas Chinese Economy of Korea

Chinese diaspora in Korea
Geography of Incheon
Ethnic enclaves in South Korea
Incheon
Tourist attractions in Incheon
Murals in South Korea